Ellen Ann Crawford (born April 29, 1951) is an American actress.  She is known for her role as Nurse Lydia Wright on ER from 1994 through 2003 and then again in 2009 for the series finale.

Crawford has also performed on stage, in A Touch of the Poet by Eugene O'Neill. Crawford also made a couple of guest appearances in 2010 in comedy-drama Desperate Housewives.

Life and career
Crawford was born in Normal, Illinois, graduating from Carnegie Mellon University's college of Fine Arts in 1975. She is married to veteran character actor Mike Genovese. Art imitated life for the couple. On ER, Genovese portrayed officer Alfred Grabarsky, whom Nurse Wright wed during the show's third season.

Crawford previously performed on stage at the Utah Shakespeare Festival, in Cedar City, Utah, where she was Mrs Bennett in Pride and Prejudice and Miss Havisham in Great Expectations.

Filmography

References

External links

 
 

1951 births
Living people
American television actresses
Actresses from Illinois
People from Normal, Illinois
Carnegie Mellon University College of Fine Arts alumni